Road to Abbey is the first EP by Indonesian rock band J-Rocks released in 2009. It was recorded at the famous Abbey Road Studios in the United Kingdom. This album marked J-Rocks as the first Indonesian band ever to record there.

Track listing

References

External links
 Road to Abbey at Aquarius Musikindo

J-Rocks albums
2009 EPs